Flora Ogbenyeanu Ogoegbunam Azikiwe (7 August 1917 – 22 August 1983) was the first wife of Nnamdi Azikiwe, the first President of Nigeria. She served as the first First Lady of Nigeria from 1 October 1963 to 16 January 1966.

Flora Ogbenyeanu Ogoegbunam was born in Onitsha, a city in present-day Anambra State to Chief Ogoegbunam, the Adazia of Onitsha (Ndichie Chief) from Ogboli Agbor Onitsha. She met Nnamdi Azikiwe there in 1934, and the two were married on 4 April 1936. Their wedding was held at Wesley Church James Town, Accra, Gold Coast (present-day Ghana) where her husband was working as the editor of African Morning Post at the time.

Azikiwe was a member of the Eastern Working Committee of the National Council of Nigeria and the Cameroons (NCNC). She was the first Patron of the Home Science Association (HSA), formerly known as Federal Home Science Association.

On 22 August 1983, Azikiwe died at the age of 66. She and her husband had one daughter and three sons.

References

1917 births
1983 deaths
20th-century Nigerian women
People from Onitsha
First Ladies of Nigeria
Nigerian Christians
Flora
People from colonial Nigeria